Vilho Pekkala (3 April 1898 – 20 October 1974) was a Finnish wrestler and Olympic medalist.

He won a bronze medal in freestyle wrestling at the 1924 Summer Olympics in Paris.

References

1898 births
1974 deaths
People from Kotka
People from Viipuri Province (Grand Duchy of Finland)
Olympic wrestlers of Finland
Wrestlers at the 1924 Summer Olympics
Wrestlers at the 1928 Summer Olympics
Finnish male sport wrestlers
Olympic bronze medalists for Finland
Olympic medalists in wrestling
Medalists at the 1924 Summer Olympics
Sportspeople from Kymenlaakso
19th-century Finnish people
20th-century Finnish people